The Savio River Reserve extends along the River Savio in Italy. The River has preserved its natural course and its high-water bed is one of the few original landscapes left unchanged in the area around Cesena. The Reserve "merges" with urban area of Cesena, entering the town between the two historical bridges, the Ponte Vecchio (Old Bridge) and the Ponte Nuovo (New Bridge).

A depress area is assigned to the creation of meadows for the nesting. The meadows will be accessible on foot or by canoe and guided tours will also be available.

External links
 Savio River Reserve home page  

Nature reserves in Italy
Geography of Emilia-Romagna
Marine parks of Italy
Tourist attractions in Emilia-Romagna